is a Japanese triple jumper. She competed at the 2007 World Championships without reaching the final. She was a nine-time Japanese Championships triple jump champion.

Personal bests

International competition

National title
Japanese Championships
Triple jump: 2003, 2005, 2006, 2007, 2008, 2009, 2010, 2012, 2013

References

External links

Fumiyo Yoshida at JAAF 

1981 births
Living people
Sportspeople from Chiba Prefecture
Japanese female triple jumpers
World Athletics Championships athletes for Japan
Japan Championships in Athletics winners